Jesús Navas González (born 21 November 1985) is a Spanish professional footballer who plays as a right winger or a right-back for La Liga club Sevilla.

He has spent the vast majority of his career with Sevilla, playing 605 official matches and winning seven major titles, including three Europa League titles and two Copas del Rey. In 2013 he signed for Manchester City, where he won the 2013–14 Premier League. He re-joined Sevilla in 2017, going on to hold the club's record for most competitive appearances.

A Spanish international since 2009, Navas helped his country win the 2010 World Cup and Euro 2012, earning over 40 caps and scoring five goals.

Club career

Sevilla
Born in Los Palacios y Villafranca, Province of Seville, Navas joined Sevilla's youth system at age 15. In 2003–04, he made his first-team (and La Liga) debut when he played 12 minutes in a 0–1 loss at Espanyol on 23 November 2003. He added four more appearances before the season was over, and in 2004–05 he was permanently promoted to the main squad, scoring two goals from 22 games. On 3 May 2005, his contract was extended until 2010.

In 2005–06, Navas once again impressed, being a crucial element as the Andalusians claimed victory in that campaign's UEFA Cup. He appeared in all 12 matches in the competition, including the final against Middlesbrough. A deal was arranged for a transfer to Chelsea in August 2006, but the player declined the move citing possible homesickness. He was consistently listed among the best players in the league, appearing in Don Balón magazine's Top 50 each year from 2006 to 2008.

For the next three years, Navas continued to be a regular for Sevilla, always leading the team in assists, while adding nine league goals in total. He also helped them to the 2008 edition of the Copa del Rey, and to third place in the following season's championship.

Navas was ever present in the 2009–10 campaign, appearing in more than 50 games. He led the league in decisive passes (including two in the last round against Almería as Sevilla edged Mallorca for fourth place with a 3–2 away win). On 19 May 2010, he scored the second goal in a 2–0 victory in the final of the Copa del Rey against Atlético Madrid.

Navas' 2010–11 season was greatly undermined by injury, as he appeared in less than half Sevilla's matches. On 13 March 2011, he scored a rare header in a 1–1 home draw against eventual champions Barcelona, one of only two competitive goals.

Manchester City

On 4 June 2013, after speculation concerning Navas' future, Sevilla confirmed that he was leaving the club with the expectation of joining Premier League side Manchester City. The transfer, reportedly valued at £14.9 million, was completed seven days later; the player said "this is the right moment for me to take this step. I'm very happy with the opportunity and the decision."

Navas made his league debut on 19 August 2013, playing the full 90 minutes in a 4–0 home win against Newcastle United. He scored his first two goals in the competition on 24 November in a 6–0 home rout of Tottenham Hotspur.

On 2 March 2014, Navas scored City's third goal in the League Cup final as they defeated Sunderland 3–1 to win the competition. He appeared in 48 games in all competitions in his first season (scoring six goals), helping the club to win the fourth national championship in its history.

Navas returned to the Ramón Sánchez Pizjuán Stadium on 3 November 2015, playing the full 90 minutes in a 3–1 win in the group stage of the UEFA Champions League and assisting Wilfried Bony for the last goal. In the League Cup final, he came on as a substitute and scored one of the penalties in the shootout in a victory over Liverpool.

Late in the 2016–17 campaign, Navas was reconverted by new manager Pep Guardiola into a right-back, and from that position he contributed two decisive passes in a 3–1 home defeat of Hull City on 8 April 2017. On 25 May, Manchester City announced he would be leaving the club.

Return to Sevilla
On 1 August 2017, Sevilla announced the return of Navas through a video. He signed a four-year contract and was given the number 16 shirt previously worn by the late Antonio Puerta, who was a close friend.

During his second spell, Navas continued to occasionally appear at right back. On 20 September 2017, he celebrated his 400th competitive appearance for the club by scoring the only goal of the 1–0 home win over Las Palmas, and he surpassed Pablo Blanco's record of 416 matches when he came off the bench against Levante on 16 December.

Navas was made captain ahead of the 2018–19 season. On 18 October 2018, the board of directors decided to rename the main stadium of the club's training ground, the Ciudad Deportiva José Ramón Cisneros Palacios as Estadio Jesús Navas in recognition of his professional career.

On 3 January 2020, Navas became the first player to reach 500 appearances for Sevilla, when he started in a 1–1 draw against Athletic Bilbao. On 23 June 2021, it was announced that he had agreed to a new three-year deal.

International career
After breaking into the Sevilla first team, Navas made his debut for the Spain under-21s, scoring in a 1–1 draw against France on 17 August 2004. He had been remarked as a potential star after good performances for club and country, but his anxiety problems forced him to quit international football. In August 2009, he announced his desire to overcome his condition in order to stake his claim in the squad for the 2010 FIFA World Cup and made himself available for selection, stating: "To play for your country is the greatest thing and I hope to be able to, too. I have to be calm and make my decision. I have to continue taking the right steps."

On 9 November 2009, Navas was called up by coach Vicente del Bosque for friendlies with Argentina and Austria. On 14 November he made his debut against Argentina in a 2–1 win in Madrid, playing the final ten minutes in the place of Andrés Iniesta; four days later, he played the entire second half in a 5–1 win over Austria in Vienna.

Called up for the World Cup finals in South Africa, Navas scored his first international goal on 3 June 2010 in a warm-up match against South Korea, scoring the game's only goal four minutes from time. In the tournament he appeared in three matches, including the last 30 minutes plus extra time in the final against the Netherlands, when Spain lifted its first World Cup trophy.

Navas was also selected for UEFA Euro 2012, where he appeared in several games for the eventual champions as a substitute. On 18 June, he scored the game's only goal in the 87th minute of the last group stage fixture against Croatia, handing Spain the first place in Group C: he scored from close range, following an assist by Iniesta.

Picked for the 2013 FIFA Confederations Cup, Navas made three appearances from the bench. On 27 June, in the semi-final against Italy, he scored the decisive penalty in the shootout (0–0 after extra time).

Navas was one of seven players cut from Spain's final squad for the 2014 World Cup, alongside Manchester City teammate Álvaro Negredo. On 15 March 2019, after almost six years of absence from international duty, the 33-year-old returned to the national setup for Euro 2020 qualifying matches against Norway and Malta.

Style of play
Navas' main assets were his speed, dribbling skills and ability to run at opposing defenders.

Personal life
Navas suffered from chronic homesickness, to the extent he walked out of training camps in Spain because they were too far away from Seville. He also suffered from anxiety attacks and seizures, and initially refused to travel with Sevilla during pre-season to the United States due to his homesickness, later changing his mind in a bid to rid himself of this condition.

Navas' older brother, Marco, was also a footballer and a midfielder. After also graduating from Sevilla's youth academy he made three first-team appearances, and played mainly in the Segunda División. Their family is of Gitano/Romani origin.

Career statistics

Club

International

Scores and results list Spain's goal tally first, score column indicates score after each Navas goal.

Honours

Club
Sevilla
Copa del Rey: 2006–07, 2009–10
Supercopa de España: 2007
UEFA Cup/UEFA Europa League: 2005–06, 2006–07, 2019–20
UEFA Super Cup: 2006

Manchester City
Premier League: 2013–14
Football League Cup: 2013–14, 2015–16

International
Spain
FIFA World Cup: 2010
UEFA European Championship: 2012
FIFA Confederations Cup runner-up: 2013

Individual
La Liga Best Attacking Midfielder: 2009–10
UEFA La Liga Team of The Season: 2018–19
UEFA Europa League Squad of the Season: 2019–20

Orders
Gold Medal of the Royal Order of Sporting Merit: 2011

See also
List of La Liga players (400+ appearances)

Notes

References

External links

1985 births
Living people
People from Los Palacios y Villafranca
People of Spanish-Romani descent
Spanish Romani people
Sportspeople from the Province of Seville
Spanish footballers
Footballers from Andalusia
Romani footballers
Association football wingers
Association football utility players
La Liga players
Segunda División B players
Sevilla Atlético players
Sevilla FC players
Premier League players
Manchester City F.C. players
UEFA Cup winning players
UEFA Europa League winning players
Spain under-21 international footballers
Spain international footballers
2010 FIFA World Cup players
UEFA Euro 2012 players
2013 FIFA Confederations Cup players
FIFA World Cup-winning players
UEFA European Championship-winning players
Spanish expatriate footballers
Expatriate footballers in England
Spanish expatriate sportspeople in England